In statistical classification, two main approaches are called the generative approach and the discriminative approach. These compute classifiers by different approaches, differing in the degree of statistical modelling. Terminology is inconsistent, but three major types can be distinguished, following :
 A generative model is a statistical model of the joint probability distribution  on given observable variable X and target variable Y;
 A discriminative model is a model of the conditional probability  of the target Y, given an observation x; and
 Classifiers computed without using a probability model are also referred to loosely as "discriminative".
The distinction between these last two classes is not consistently made;  refers to these three classes as generative learning, conditional learning, and discriminative learning, but  only distinguish two classes, calling them generative classifiers (joint distribution) and discriminative classifiers (conditional distribution or no distribution), not distinguishing between the latter two classes. Analogously, a classifier based on a generative model is a generative classifier, while a classifier based on a discriminative model is a discriminative classifier, though this term also refers to classifiers that are not based on a model.

Standard examples of each, all of which are linear classifiers, are:

 generative classifiers: 
 naive Bayes classifier and 
 linear discriminant analysis
 discriminative model: 
 logistic regression

In application to classification, one wishes to go from an observation x to a label y (or probability distribution on labels). One can compute this directly, without using a probability distribution (distribution-free classifier); one can estimate the probability of a label given an observation,  (discriminative model), and base classification on that; or one can estimate the joint distribution  (generative model), from that compute the conditional probability , and then base classification on that. These are increasingly indirect, but increasingly probabilistic, allowing more domain knowledge and probability theory to be applied. In practice different approaches are used, depending on the particular problem, and hybrids can combine strengths of multiple approaches.

Definition 
An alternative division defines these symmetrically as:

 a generative model is a model of the conditional probability of the observable X, given a target y, symbolically, 
 a discriminative model is a model of the conditional probability of the target Y, given an observation x, symbolically, 

Regardless of precise definition, the terminology is constitutional because a generative model can be used to "generate" random instances (outcomes), either of an observation and target , or of an observation x given a target value y, while a discriminative model or discriminative classifier (without a model) can be used to "discriminate" the value of the target variable Y, given an observation x. The difference between "discriminate" (distinguish) and "classify" is subtle, and these are not consistently distinguished. (The term "discriminative classifier" becomes a pleonasm when "discrimination" is equivalent to "classification".)

The term "generative model" is also used to describe models that generate instances of output variables in a way that has no clear relationship to probability distributions over potential samples of input variables. Generative adversarial networks are examples of this class of generative models, and are judged primarily by the similarity of particular outputs to potential inputs. Such models are not classifiers.

Relationships between models 
In application to classification, the observable X is frequently a continuous variable, the target Y is generally a discrete variable consisting of a finite set of labels, and the conditional probability  can also be interpreted as a (non-deterministic) target function , considering X as inputs and Y as outputs.

Given a finite set of labels, the two definitions of "generative model" are closely related. A model of the conditional distribution  is a model of the distribution of each label, and a model of the joint distribution is equivalent to a model of the distribution of label values , together with the distribution of observations given a label, ; symbolically,  Thus, while a model of the joint probability distribution is more informative than a model of the distribution of label (but without their relative frequencies), it is a relatively small step, hence these are not always distinguished.

Note that Bayes' rule (computing one conditional probability in terms of the other) and the definition of conditional probability (computing conditional probability in terms of the joint distribution) are frequently conflated as well.

Contrast with discriminative classifiers
A generative algorithm models how the data was generated in order to categorize a signal. It asks the question: based on my generation assumptions, which category is most likely to generate this signal? A discriminative algorithm does not care about how the data was generated, it simply categorizes a given signal. So, discriminative algorithms try to learn  directly from the data and then try to classify data. On the other hand, generative algorithms try to learn  which can be transformed into  later to classify the data. One of the advantages of generative algorithms is that you can use  to generate new data similar to existing data. On the other hand, it has been proved that some discriminative algorithms give better performance than some generative algorithms in classification tasks.

Despite the fact that discriminative models do not need to model the distribution of the observed variables, they cannot generally express complex relationships between the observed and target variables. But in general, they don't necessarily perform better than generative models at classification and regression tasks. The two classes are seen as complementary or as different views of the same procedure.

Deep generative models 
With the rise of deep learning, a new family of methods, called deep generative models (DGMs), is formed through the combination of generative models and deep neural networks. An increase in the scale of the neural networks is typically accompanied by an increase in the scale of the training data, both of which are required for good performance.

Popular DGMs include variational autoencoders (VAEs), generative adversarial networks (GANs), and auto-regressive models. Recently, there has been a trend to build very large deep generative models. For example, GPT-3, and its precursor GPT-2, are auto-regressive neural language models that contain billions of parameters, BigGAN and VQ-VAE which are used for image generation that can have hundreds of millions of parameters, and Jukebox is a very large generative model for musical audio that contains billions of parameters.

Types

Generative models 

Types of generative models are:

 Gaussian mixture model (and other types of mixture model)
 Hidden Markov model
 Probabilistic context-free grammar
 Bayesian network (e.g. Naive bayes, Autoregressive model)
 Averaged one-dependence estimators
 Latent Dirichlet allocation
 Boltzmann machine (e.g. Restricted Boltzmann machine, Deep belief network)
 Variational autoencoder
 Generative adversarial network
 Flow-based generative model
 Energy based model
 Diffusion model

If the observed data are truly sampled from the generative model, then fitting the parameters of the generative model to maximize the data likelihood is a common method. However, since most statistical models are only approximations to the true distribution, if the model's application is to infer about a subset of variables conditional on known values of others, then it can be argued that the approximation makes more assumptions than are necessary to solve the problem at hand. In such cases, it can be more accurate to model the conditional density functions directly using a discriminative model (see below), although application-specific details will ultimately dictate which approach is most suitable in any particular case.

Discriminative models 

 k-nearest neighbors algorithm
 Logistic regression
 Support Vector Machines
 Decision Tree Learning
 Random Forest
 Maximum-entropy Markov models
 Conditional random fields

Examples

Simple example 

For the above data, estimating the joint probability distribution  from the empirical measure will be the following:

while  will be following:

Text generation 
 gives an example in which a table of frequencies of English word pairs is used to generate a sentence beginning with "representing and speedily is an good"; which is not proper English but which will increasingly approximate it as the table is moved from word pairs to word triplets etc.

See also 

 Discriminative model
 Graphical model

Notes

References

External links

 
 
 
 
 , (mirror, mirror), published as book (above)
 Code accompanying the book: 

Machine learning
Statistical models
Probabilistic models